Year 1417 (MCDXVII) was a common year starting on Friday (link will display the full calendar) of the Julian calendar.

Events 
<onlyinclude>

January–December 
 June 29 – An English fleet, led by the Earl of Huntingdon, defeats a fleet of Genoese carracks and captures their admiral, the "Bastard of Bourbon".  
 July 27 – Avignon Pope Benedict XIII is deposed, bringing to an end the Great Western Schism. 
 August 12 – King Henry V of England begins using English in correspondence (back to England from France whilst on campaign), marking the beginning of this king's continuous usage of English in prose, and the beginning of the restoration of English as an official language for the first time since the Norman Conquest, some 350 years earlier.
 September 20 – Henry V of England captures Caen, Normandy, which remains in English hands until 1450.
 November 14 – Pope Martin V succeeds Pope Gregory XII (who abdicated in 1415), as the 206th pope.

Date unknown 
 The earliest extant description of Tynwald Day; the annual meeting of the Isle of Man's parliament (Tynwald) is written down in law.
 The use of street lighting is first recorded in London, England when Sir Henry Barton, the mayor, orders lanterns with lights to be hung out on the winter evenings, between Hallowtide and Candlemas.
 Mircea cel Bătrân loses Dobruja to the Ottomans and pays them tribute, thus preventing Wallachia from becoming an Ottoman province. 
 Chimalpopoca, son of Huitzilihuitl, succeeds his father as Tlatoani (monarch) of Tenochtitlan (modern Mexico City)

Births 
 February 23
 Pope Paul II (d. 1471)
 Louis IX, Duke of Bavaria-Landshut (1450–1479) (d. 1479)
 May 25 – Catherine of Cleves, Duchess consort regent of Guelders (d. 1479)
 June 19 – Sigismondo Pandolfo Malatesta, lord of Rimini (d. 1468)
 November 8 – Philipp I, Count of Hanau-Lichtenberg (1458–1480) (d. 1480)
 November 19 – Frederick I, Count Palatine of Simmern from 1459 until 1480 (d. 1480)
 November 23 – William FitzAlan, 16th Earl of Arundel, English politician (d. 1487)
 date unknown
 Jöns Bengtsson Oxenstierna, regent of Sweden 1457 and 1465–1466, archbishop of Uppsala 1448–1467
 Nicholas of Flüe, Swiss hermit and saint (d. 1487)

Deaths 
 January – Art mac Art MacMurrough-Kavanagh, King of Leinster (b. 1357)
 March 5 – Manuel III Megas Komnenos, Emperor of Trebizond (b. 1364)
 April 29 – Louis II of Anjou (b. 1377)
 September 4 – Robert Hallam, English Catholic bishop
 September 22 – Anne of Auvergne, Sovereign Dauphine of Auvergne and Countess of Forez (b. 1358)
 September 26 – Francesco Zabarella, Italian jurist (b. 1360)
 October 18 – Pope Gregory XII (b. c.1325)
 November 17 – Gazi Evrenos, Ottoman general (b. 1288)
 December 14 – John Oldcastle, English Lollard leader (executed)
 probable – Huitzilíhuitl, Aztec ruler of Tenochtitlan

References